The 1935 Howard Bulldogs football team represented Howard College in the 1935 college football season. The team tied Alabama, and won the Dixie Conference.

Schedule

References

Howard
Howard
Samford Bulldogs football seasons
Howard Bulldogs football